The Margaret Mead Film Festival is an annual film festival held at the American Museum of Natural History in New York City. It is the longest-running, premiere showcase for international documentaries in the United States, encompassing a broad spectrum of work, from indigenous community media to experimental nonfiction. The Festival is distinguished by its outstanding selection of titles, which tackle diverse and challenging subjects, representing a range of issues and perspectives, and by the forums for discussion with filmmakers and speakers.

The Mead Festival has a distinguished history of “firsts,” including being the first venue to screen the now-classic documentary Paris Is Burning (1990) about the urban transgender community. Furthermore the Mead Festival has introduced New York audiences to such acclaimed films as the Oscar-winning documentary The Blood of Yingzhou District (2006), Oscar-winning animated short The Moon and the Son: An Imagined Conversation (2005), The Future of Food (2004), Power Trip (2003), and Spellbound (2002).

Background

The festival owes its origins (and its name) to renowned anthropologist Margaret Mead, who worked for 52 years at the American Museum of Natural History. She acted as curator in the Museum's Department of Anthropology, where she helped create the Hall of Pacific Peoples, which bears her name. In her lifetime, Margaret Mead greatly advanced the academic standing and popular appeal of cultural anthropology, and was also one of the earliest anthropologists to integrate visual methods into her research, focus on the study of visual communication, and teach courses on culture and communication. "Pictures are held together," Dr. Mead wrote, "by a way of looking that has grown out of anthropology, a science in which all peoples, however contrasted in physique and culture, are seen as members of the same species, engaged in solving problems common to humanity."

In 1976, in commemoration of her 75th birthday, the museum decided to pay tribute to her work with a film festival of top ethnographic and other documentary films. In its early years, the festival focused on ethnographic films and was hosted by the USC Center for Visual Anthropology (directed by Mead's student, the late filmmaker Tim Asch). Today, the Festival continues to exemplify Mead's teachings: that film is a tool for cross-cultural understanding and that it is possible, and important, for societies to learn from each other.

Margaret Mead Filmmaker Award
Margaret Mead Filmmaker Award recognizes documentary filmmakers who embody the spirit, energy, and innovation demonstrated by anthropologist Margaret Mead in her research, fieldwork, films, and writings. Each year the award is given to a filmmaker whose feature documentary offers a new perspective on a culture or community remote from the majority of our audiences' experience as well as displays artistic excellence and originality in storytelling technique. U.S., North American, or World Premiere documentaries (60 minutes or longer) are eligible for the Award. This award has a cash prize.
 2010 Winner: Marc Francis/Nick Francis for When China Met Africa
 2011 Winner: Yuanchen Liu for To the Light 
 2012 Winner: Adam Isenberg for A Life Without Words

Traveling Festival
The Margaret Mead Traveling Film & Video Festival presents highlights of the Festival that takes place in November. Each year titles are selected from the annual Mead Festival to participate in this year-long program which brings innovative non-fiction work to communities throughout the United States and abroad.

2012 Mead Festival

 18 Days in Egypt by Jigar Mehta and Yasmin Elayat
 Bad Weather by Giovanni Giommi - Mead Filmmaker Award Nominee
 Bay of All Saints
 Bury the Hatchet by Aaron Walker
 Buzkashi!
 Children of Srikandi
 A Fierce Green Fire: The Battle for a Living Planet
 George Stoney Tribute: How the Myth Was Made
 Grab
 Himself He Cooks by Valérie Berteau and Philippe Witjes - Mead Filmmaker Award Nominee
 The Human Tower by Ram Devineni and Cano Rojas - Mead Filmmaker Award Nominee
 Jai Bhim Comrade
 Keep Me Upright (Tiens moi droite) by Zoé Chantre - Mead Filmmaker Award Nominee
 A Life Without Words (Una Vida Sin Palabras) by Adam Isenberg - Mead Filmmaker Award Nominee
 The Light in Her Eyes
 Manapanmirr, in Christmas Spirit by Miyarrka Media - Mead Filmmaker Award Nominee
 Maori Boy Genius by Pietra Brettkelly - Mead Filmmaker Award Nominee
 Mead Arcade
 Meanwhile in Mamelodi by Benjamin Kahlmeyer
 Nagaland: The Last of the Headhunters by Patrick Morell - Mead Filmmaker Award Nominee
 Re-Seeing the Century: The Expedition on Film
 Sun Kissed
 Sweet Dreams
 The Other Half of Tomorrow by Sadia Shepard and Samina Quraeshi - Mead Filmmaker Award Nominee
 Through Navajo Eyes
 Tropicália
 Tundra Book. A Tale of Vukvukla, the Little Rock (Kniga Tundry. Povest' o Vukvukaye - malen'kom kamne)
 Tunniit: Retracing the Lines of Inuit Tattoos (Atuaqsiniq Inuit Tunninginnik)
 Wheat and Tares (Het Kaf en Het Koren) by Stefan Wittekamp and Suzanne Arts - Mead Filmmaker Award Nominee
 Whose Story Is It? Story Lounge

2011 Mead Festival

2011 Films

 At Night, They Dance (La nuit, elles dansent) by Isabelle Lavigne and Stéphane Thibault
 The Bengali Detective by Phil Cox
 Blue Meridian by Sofie Benoot
 Broad Channel by Sarah J. Christman
 Cinema and the Future of Space by Michael Shara
 Convento by Jarred Alterman
 The Creators by Laura Gamse
 Deus Ex Boltanski by Robert Gardner
 Empty Quarter by Alain LeTourneau and Pam Minty
 The End of the World (Kres Šwiata) by Mateusz Skalski
 Extraction by Myron Lameman
 Flames of God by Meshakai Wolf
 Grande Hotel by Lotte Stoops
 Guañape Sur by János Richter
 Hula and Natan by Robby Elmaliah
 Moroloja by Alexander Ingham Brooke
 The Observers by Jacqueline Goss
 Planet Kirsan (Planeta Kirsan) by Magdalena Pita
 Skydancer by Katja Esson
 Space Tourists by Christian Frei
 Voice Unknown by Jinhee Park
 White Elephant (Nzoku ya Pembe) by Kristof Bilsen

2011 Mead Filmmaker Award Nominees 
 All for the Good of the World and Nošovice (Vše Pro Dobro Svêta a Nošovic)by Vit Klusák
 Kinder (Kids) by Bettina Büttner
 Memoirs of a Plague by Robert Nugent
 Rainmakers by Floris-Jan van Luyn
 Small Kingdom of Lo by Caroline Leitner, Daniel Mazza, and Giuseppe Tedesch
 Space Sailors (Fliegerkosmonauten) by Marian Kiss
 To the Light by Yuanchen Liu

2011 Retrospective Series
 Jaguar by Jean Rouch
 Jero on Jero: A Balinese Trance Séance Observed by Patsy Asch, Timothy Asch, and Linda Connor
 Kanehsatake: 270 Years of Resistance by Alanis Obomsawin
 Les maîtres fous (The Mad Masters) by Jean Rouch
 N!ai, The Story of a !Kung Woman by John Marshall and Adrienne Miesmer
 Trance and Dance in Bali by Gregory Bateson and Margaret Mead
 A Wife Among Wives by David MacDougall and Judith MacDougall
 We Still Live Here (Âs Natayuneân) by Anne Makepeace

2011 Jury
The Mead Award jury is led by the Academy Award-nominated director of Black Swan and The Wrestler, Darren Aronofsky, Karen Cooper, director of New York City's Film Forum; Liz Garbus, Academy Award-nominated director of Bobby Fischer Against the World, The Farm and 2002 MacArthur Fellow Stanley Nelson, director of the Emmy-winning documentary The Murder of Emmett Till.

See also
Film festivals in North and Central America

References

External links
Official Website

Further reading
Lutkehaus, Nancy D. Margaret Mead: The Making of an American Icon. Princeton University Press, 2008.
"Mead Film Festival." Yarrow, A. New York Times, Monday, September 14, 1987.
"A World of Families" Press Release, American Museum of Natural History, 2002.

Documentary film festivals in the United States
Film festivals in New York City
Visual anthropology